Chelsy is a three-piece Japanese pop rock and J-pop girl band signed to SMAR. They are known for the insert song "I will" in the Ao Haru Ride anime. The band disbanded in May 2018.

Discography
 I'LL BE ON MY WAY (released March 19, 2014)
 I will / Animation EP (released September 24, 2014)
 YES / Good-bye girl (released December 3, 2014)
 SistAr(released May 27, 2015)

References

External links
Official website 

Japanese musical groups
Being Inc. artists
Musical groups established in 2011
2011 establishments in Japan